Fominskoye is a rural locality (a village) in Pogorelovskoye Rural Settlement, Totemsky District, Vologda Oblast, Russia. The population was 102 as of 2002.

Geography 
Fominskoye is located 53 km southwest of Totma (the district's administrative centre) by road. Gorbentsovo is the nearest rural locality.

References 

Rural localities in Totemsky District